The Dancer Baronetcy, of Modreeny in the County of Waterford, was a title in the Baronetage of Ireland. It was created on 12 August 1662 for Thomas Dancer. The title became extinct on the death of the seventh Baronet in 1933.

Dancer baronets, of Modreeny (1662)
Sir Thomas Dancer, 1st Baronet (died 1689)  
Sir Thomas Dancer, 2nd Baronet (died 1703)  
Sir Loftus Dancer, 3rd Baronet (died 1734) 
Sir Thomas Dancer, 4th Baronet (–1776)   
Sir Amyrald Dancer, 5th Baronet (1768–1843) 
Sir Thomas Bernard Going Dancer, 6th Baronet (1806–1872) 
Sir Thomas Johnston Dancer, 7th Baronet (1852–1933)

References

Extinct baronetcies in the Baronetage of Ireland